also known as Inadome Ichimu was a Japanese military engineer and commander of the Sengoku period. He served the Isshiki clan as a senior retainer and later he served Hosokawa Tadaoki.

He was taught gunnery techniques by his grandfather Inadome Sukehide and later he founded Inadome school of gunnery.

Before the Battle of Sekigahara, he took charge of Hosokawa Garasha's protection. When Ishida Mitsunari attempted to take Gracia as a hostage and surrounded Hosokawa clan's residence, he escaped without protecting Garasha.

Later he served the Tokugawa Shogunate as a gunnery instructor.

References

Samurai
1552 births
1611 deaths